Pool D of the 2017 Fed Cup Europe/Africa Group III was one of four pools in the Europe/Africa Group III of the 2017 Fed Cup. Four teams competed in a round robin competition, with the top team and bottom teams proceeding to their respective section of the play-offs: the top team played for advancement to Group II.

Standings 

Standings are determined by: 1. number of wins; 2. if two teams have the same number of wins, head-to-head record; 3. if three teams have the same number of wins, (a) number of matches won in the group, then (b) percentage of sets won in the group, then (c) percentage of games won in the group, then (d) Fed Cup rankings.

Round-robin

Moldova vs. Mozambique

Morocco vs. Algeria

Moldova vs. Algeria

Morocco vs. Mozambique

Moldova vs. Morocco

Algeria vs. Mozambique

See also
Fed Cup structure

References

External links
 Fed Cup website

A3